Stuart Turner (born 22 April 1972 in Southport, Merseyside, England) was a rugby union player for Sale Sharks in the Guinness Premiership. In the 2005–2006 season, Turner started the final as Sale Sharks won their first ever Premiership title. He retired in 2009.

Turner's position of choice is as a prop.

References

External links
Sale profile
England profile

1972 births
Living people
England international rugby union players
English rugby union players
Rotherham Titans players
Rugby union players from Southport
Rugby union props
Sale Sharks players
Waterloo R.F.C. players